The Russia national hockey team may refer to:

 Russia national bandy team
 Russia women's national bandy team
 Russia men's national field hockey team
 Russia women's national field hockey team
 Russia men's national ice hockey team
 Russia men's national junior ice hockey team
 Russia men's national under-18 ice hockey team
 Russia women's national ice hockey team
 Russia women's national under-18 ice hockey team

Olympic Athletes from Russia
 Olympic Athletes from Russia men's national ice hockey team
 Olympic Athletes from Russia women's national ice hockey team

Defunct
 Soviet Union national ice hockey team
 Soviet Union national junior ice hockey team
 Soviet Union national under-18 ice hockey team
 Unified Team national ice hockey team